"I Saw Three Ships (Come Sailing In)" is an English Christmas carol, listed as number 700 in the Roud Folk Song Index. The earliest printed version of "I Saw Three Ships" is from the 17th century, possibly Derbyshire, and was also published by William Sandys in 1833. The song was probably traditionally known as "As I Sat On a Sunny Bank", and was particularly popular in Cornwall.

Lyrics 
The modern lyrics are from an 1833 version by the English lawyer and antiquarian William Sandys, and consist of nine verses.

The reference to three ships is thought to originate in the three ships that bore the purported relics of the Biblical magi to Cologne Cathedral in the 12th century. Another possible reference is to Wenceslaus II, King of Bohemia, who bore a coat of arms "Azure three galleys argent". Another suggestion is that the ships are actually the camels used by the Magi, as camels are frequently referred to as "ships of the desert".

Traditional recordings and collected versions 
Countless traditional versions of the song have been collected. Many different melodies were used, as is typical of traditional folk songs including Christmas carols. In the 1910s, the English folklorists Cecil Sharp and Janet Blunt noted the tunes and lyrics of dozens of versions, primarily in the south of England.

Several traditional recordings have been made of the song  The American folk song collector James Madison Carpenter recorded several slightly different English versions in the early 1930s, all of which can be heard online via the Vaughan Williams Memorial Library, several recorded in Cornwall and one in Gloucestershire. In 1956, Peter Kennedy recorded a man named John Thomas singing the song in Camborne, Cornwall.

The famous Appalachian musician Jean Ritchie was recorded by Alan Lomax in 1949 singing a traditional version learnt from her Kentucky family (whose ancestors seemingly brought the song from England), which can be heard courtesy of the Alan Lomax archive. Ritchie later recorded the song on her album 'Carols of All Seasons' (1959). Whilst Jean Ritchie's family version is the only traditional American version to be recorded, the song was known to be present in the United States in previous decades, particularly in the south.

Whilst collecting folk songs in the British Isles in 1952, Jean Ritchie and her husband George Pickow encountered the Irish traditional singer Elizabeth Cronin in Macroom, Co. Cork, who sang a version called "The Bells of Heaven".

Arrangements
An arrangement by Martin Shaw appears in the Oxford Book of Carols. The Carols for Choirs series of carol books features arrangements of the carol by both Sir David Willcocks and John Rutter. Organist Simon Preston and former conductor of the Choir of King's College, Cambridge, Sir Philip Ledger, have also written arrangements that the choir have performed at the Festival of Nine Lessons and Carols in recent years. There is also a more recent choral arrangement by British composer Richard Fox.  This carol is also featured in the musical Caroline, or Change, but as a counterpoint. Adapted by Jon Schmidt on Jon Schmidt Christmas album. John Renbourn has arranged it (in a rather free adaptation) for guitar. The song appears on Nat King Cole's 1960 album The Magic of Christmas (l/k/a "The Christmas Song"), arranged by Ralph Carmichael.

Other versions

 "I saw three ships come sailing by on New Year's Day" is a 19th-century version, which mentions three pretty girls in the ship entertaining at a wedding held on New Year's Day.

Other recordings

 English musician Sting recorded a version for the compilation album A Very Special Christmas 3 in 1997.
 Progressive rock singer Jon Anderson released a version as the title track of his album 3 Ships in 1985.
 Keyboardist Keith Emerson recorded an instrumental rock adaptation on his The Christmas Album (1988).
 In 1995, Glen Campbell recorded the song on his Christmas album Christmas with Glen Campbell.
 Barenaked Ladies recorded the song on their 2004 Christmas album Barenaked for the Holidays
 Blackmore's Night recorded the song on their 2006 Christmas-themed album Winter Carols.
 Lindsey Stirling released her version on her holiday album Warmer in the Winter.
 Celtic Woman released their version on Christmas Cards From Ireland in 2022.

See also
 List of Christmas carols

References

External links

 
 History, lyrics and sheet music at The Hymns and Carols of Christmas
 Free sheet music for piano, voice and SATB from Cantorion.org
 Full lyrics

Christmas carols
Burl Ives songs
Glen Campbell songs
Jean Ritchie songs
British Christmas songs
Sting (musician) songs
Cultural depictions of the Biblical Magi
Christmas in England
Sailing in England
17th-century songs
17th century in England
Epiphany music